is a Japanese professional shogi player ranked 6-dan, and a chess player holding the title of FIDE Master.

Early life
Mirai Aoshima was born on February 27, 1995, in Mishima, Shizuoka. He learned how to play shogi when he was about six years old from a shogi book his father bought him.

Shogi professional

Apprentice professional
Aoshima entered the Japan Shogi Association's apprentice school at the rank of 6-kyū under the tutelage of shogi professional  in 2005. He was promoted to the rank of 3-dan in 2012 and then obtained full professional status and the rank of 4-dan after taking first place in the 56th 3-dan League with a record of 16 wins and 2 losses.

Promotion history
Aoshima's promotion history is as follows:
 6-kyū: September 2005
 3-dan: October 2012
 4-dan: April 1, 2015
 5-dan: March 3, 2016
 6-dan: June 16, 2020

Awards and honors
Aoshima received the Japan Shogi Association Annual Shogi Awards for "Best Winning Percentage" and "Most Consecutive Games Won" for 2016.

Chess
Aoshima is a FIDE Master with a peak FIDE rating of 2361 in September 2019. In 2019, he won the Tokyo Chess Championship and the Japan Chess Championship.

References

External links
ShogiHub: Professional Player Info · Aoshima, Mirai

Japanese shogi players
Living people
Professional shogi players
Japanese chess players
Chess FIDE Masters
Azabu High School alumni
Professional shogi players from Shizuoka Prefecture
1995 births